The Neerja Bhanot Award is an award of recognition conferred up to once a year by the Neerja Bhanot-Pan Am Trust in India to a woman of that country subjected to social injustice, who faces the situation with grit and determination and extends help to other women in similar distress. The annual Neerja Bhanot Award was instituted in 1990 and named in honour of Senior Flight Purser, Neerja Bhanot, who saved hundreds of lives while sacrificing her own, during the Pan Am Flight 73 hijack at Karachi Airport (Pakistan), in September 1986. It carries a cash prize of Rs 1.5 lakh, a citation and a trophy.

Recipients
2001 – Yasoda Ekambaram
2003 – Shivani Gupta
2004 – Mangala Patil
2008 – Chanda Asani
2012 – Asha Manwani
2014 – Rashmi Anand
2015 – Subhashini Vasanth
2016 - Sindhutai Sapkal
2017 - Dr. Sarojini Agrawal

Other Awardees over the years 

 Purnima Sadhana (1991)
 Sadhna Pawar (1991)
 Satya Rani Chadha (1992)
 Amrita Ahuwalia (1992)
 Shehnaz Shaikh (1993)
 Bhanwari Devi (1994)
 Alice Garg (2000)
 Flavia Agnes (2002)
 Shifiya Haneef (Kerala) (2019)

See also

 List of awards honoring women

References

External links
Courage Commitment Compassion – Neerja Bhanot – official website

Awards established in 1990
Awards honoring women
Civil awards and decorations of India
Humanitarian and service awards
Women in India